Leandro Bernardi Silva, shortly Leandro (born October 6, 1979, in Osasco) is a Brazilian footballer who plays as a defender for Paysandu Sport Club.

Career 
Paraná Clube engaged on 28 March 2009 the Brazilian defender, the player arrives from Daegu FC (Korea).

References
 Leandro at sambafoot.com

External links
 

1979 births
Living people
Brazilian footballers
Brazilian expatriate footballers
Association football defenders
Adap Galo Maringá Football Club players
Centro Sportivo Alagoano players
Coritiba Foot Ball Club players
Associação Atlética Ponte Preta players
Avaí FC players
Paysandu Sport Club players
Al-Ahli Saudi FC players
Expatriate footballers in Saudi Arabia
Expatriate footballers in South Korea
Daegu FC players
K League 1 players
Brazilian expatriate sportspeople in South Korea
People from Osasco
Saudi Professional League players
Footballers from São Paulo (state)